Through Main Street with an Orchestra  is a 1986 Soviet musical film directed by Pyotr Todorovsky.

Plot
50-year-old teacher Vasily Muravin is experiencing a middle-age crisis. He is replaced at work from his post as head of the department by a more pragmatic, but limited Valentin Romanovsky and his wife Lida earns more than him and habitually complains about his indecisiveness. Muravin finds it difficult to reconcile with peoples attitude towards him, but what makes him the most upset is his wife's disrespect towards his main hobby – guitar playing. One day unable to bear any more mockery he leaves his home. He plays for the public at the River Station and then decides not to return home or to work.

During one of his speeches to an idle public Muravin  sees his daughter Ksenia. A new level of communication begins between them when they learn things about each other that they did notice during the time they lived together. Father helps Ksyusha to understand the situation with a married doctor Igor, from whom she is bearing a child (it later turns out to be a lie to make Igor stay with her).

Ksyusha tries to teach practicality to her father after she sees that the arranger Konstantin Mikhailovich brazenly appropriates the melodies which her father played on guitar.

For Muravin, what is more important is the existence of melodies and his own independence from the "artistic council".

Cast
 Oleg Borisov as Vasily Pavlovich Muravin
 Lidiya Fedoseyeva-Shukshina as Lidiya Ivanovna,  Muravin's wife 
 Marina Zudina as Ksenia (Ksyusha), Muravin's daughter  
 Valentin Gaft as Konstantin Mikhailovich Vinogradov, a music arranger
 Igor Kostolevsky as Igor, beloved Ksenia
 Valentina Telichkina as Zhenya, Igor's wife
 Oleg Menshikov  as Fedor Korolykov, student Polytechnic University
 Lyudmila Maksakova as Alla
 Alexander Lazarev as Valentin Romanovsky, Head of Department
 Svetlana Nemolyaeva as Romanovskaya
 Sergey Zhigunov as Lieutenant Zhigunov, policeman

References

External links
   

Films directed by Pyotr Todorovsky
Mosfilm films
Soviet musical films
1980s Russian-language films